Ceratogyrus darlingi (commonly called burst horned baboon tarantula or African rear-horned baboon tarantula, synonym Ceratogyrus bechuanicus) is a theraphosid spider from southern Africa, mainly Botswana and Lesotho. The peltidium features a black foveal horn.

As pets 

C. darlingi, often still known under its obsolete name C. bechuanicus, is the most common Ceratogyrus species held in captivity, although it is very defensive and fast. When kept in captivity, it requires dry substrate, such as coconut fiber, on which to live. This allows it to burrow, as they are obligate burrowers. As this species is from a very arid habitat, it cannot cope with too much moisture.

They will readily take crickets, roaches, and superworms but tend to shy away from large prey items. Food is usually pulled in and eaten inside the burrow. Molting also occurs inside the burrow.

Pairs will breed readily and quickly. Females could live an approximate 10 to 15 years in captivity.

References

External links
 Picture of C. bechuanicus spiderling
 Picture of adult female
 Pictures

Theraphosidae
Spiders of Africa
Spiders described in 1897